Schieffelin may refer to:

Samuel Schieffelin (1811–1900), an American author of religious tracts.
Bradhurst Schieffelin (1824–1909), an American political activist during the Civil War, who later became a member of the People's Party 
Eugene Schieffelin (1827–1906), responsible for introducing the starling (Sturnus vulgaris) to North America
Ed Schieffelin (1847–1897), an Indian scout and prospector who discovered silver in the Arizona Territory, which led to the founding of Tombstone, Arizona. 
Bambi Schieffelin, a linguistic anthropologist at New York University in the department of Anthropology